The 1994 Boston College Eagles football team represented Boston College in the 1994 NCAA Division I-A football season. The Eagles were led by first-year head coach Dan Henning and played their home games at Alumni Stadium in Chestnut Hill, Massachusetts. They competed as members of the Big East Conference, finishing fifth with a conference record of 3–3–1. Boston College was invited to the 1994 Aloha Bowl, where they defeated then-No. 11 Kansas State, 12–7. They finished the season ranked 23rd in the AP Poll and 22nd in the Coaches' Poll.

Schedule

Roster

Team players in the NFL

References

Boston College
Boston College Eagles football seasons
Aloha Bowl champion seasons
Boston College Eagles football
Boston College Eagles football